Zinuay Jian (also Romanized as Zīnūāy Jān; also known as Zīnūn Jīān) is a village in Lahijan Rural District, in the Central District of Piranshahr County, West Azerbaijan Province, Iran. At the 2006 census, its population was 194, in 34 families.

References 

Populated places in Piranshahr County